Gerben Hellinga jr. (Zaltbommel, 12 December 1938, real name Gerben Graddesz Hellinga) is a Dutch author of science-fiction and historic novels.

He studied medicine and graduated as a psychiatrist in 1975. In 1985 he won the King Kong Award (now known as Paul Harland Prize). In 1986 his first novel was published: Coriolis, de stormplaneet (science-fiction).

References 
Paul Harland Prijs 2008
www.collegenet.nl 
Schrijfwedstrijden & opleidingen – NCSF

1938 births
Living people
Dutch science fiction writers